Herbert Wieninger (1 October 1910 – 6 February 2002) was an Austrian composer. His work was part of the music event in the art competition at the 1936 Summer Olympics.

References

1910 births
2002 deaths
Austrian male composers
Olympic competitors in art competitions
Musicians from Vienna
20th-century male musicians